Richard Dominick is an American television producer who was the executive producer of NBCUniversal Domestic Television Distribution's Jerry Springer from 1994-2008. Dominick also served in the same capacity on The Steve Wilkos Show for its first season, as well as the truTV police series Bait Car. He later produced (and created) another popular truTV series, Hardcore Pawn.

Early life and career 
Dominick began his career as the artistic director of the New Jersey Public Theater. While there, he also created, wrote and performed in the Comedy Workshop, a group that innovated late night weekend comedy presentations.

Journalism 
His next career move was into journalism for the Weekly World News and Sun where he reported on stories like "Toaster Possessed by the Devil" and "Howdy Doody Dummy Comes Alive and Saves Drowning Man." With his unique perspective, Dominick made seven appearances on Late Night with David Letterman to discuss his unusual assignments.

Transition to television
Versed in writing, reporting and directing, Dominick soon made the transition into television with The Wilton North Report, a short-lived late night comedy program for Fox.  Later, he served as a producer for a 1990 syndicated revival of the TV series House Party, which was hosted by future Fox and Friends co-host Steve Doocy. Dominick was also the sole writer for ESPN's Sports Emmy Awards, broadcast live in May 1991 and hosted by Saturday Night Live alumni comedian Dennis Miller. 

Dominick also contributed comedy material as a freelance writer to Jay Leno.  Other jobs have included writing for The Jenny Jones Show and serving as supervising producer of Not Just News, a syndicated children's news program that aired during the 1991-92 season. Dominick has also made his mark as a freelance writer for such publications as National Lampoon, Cracked and Penthouse where, on assignment in 1990, he traveled the entire United States in search of Elvis Presley.

Jerry Springer

In 1991, Dominick joined Jerry Springer and became the show's executive producer three years later, following the departure of original producer Burt Dubrow. Around this time, Jerry Springer was on the verge of being cancelled, prompting Dominick to take drastic action with regards to the show's format. He turned the world of TV talk shows upside down by taking the show out of the hands of experts and allowing ordinary people to come on stage and offer a slice of their lives - something they never had a chance to do before. He demanded his producers "make the show interesting with the sound off" and encouraged the show's controversial themes and topics, which led to the show's success and turned Jerry Springer himself into a pop culture icon. In 1998, Springer had made it to the top, knocking The Oprah Winfrey Show out of the top spot for 57 straight weeks. This led to Dominick being named one of 1998's "Marketing 100" by Advertising Age magazine. He was quoted in Newsweek as saying, "If you want to save the whales, call Oprah. If you're dating a whale, call us." Dominick was also responsible for the sound effects that are often heard on the show.
Dominick was also one of the executive producers for Springer's 1998 film Ringmaster.

The Springer Hustle
In 2006, Dominick teamed with VH1 to create a behind-the-scenes show, following the events of Jerry Springer.  It debuted to good ratings, but was canceled after one season.  Dominick dropped the show after finding it was too much on his heavy producing load.

The Steve Wilkos Show
In September 2007, former Jerry Springer bodyguard Steve Wilkos started his own show, taking on predators and bad parents.  Richard Dominick served as the show's Executive Producer for the first season.  He was relieved of his duties following the production of the second season.

Departure from Springer and Wilkos
Dominick announced he was leaving both Jerry Springer as well as The Steve Wilkos Show on September 3, 2008, to pursue other television offers as well as continue to grow his production company.  

Dominick's production company and truTV launched the reality series Hardcore Pawn in 2010. The show was recorded at American Jewelry and Loan.

Personal life
Dominick has two children.

References

External links

Place of birth missing (living people)
Year of birth missing (living people)
Living people
American television producers